Wooley v. Maynard, 430 U.S. 705 (1977), was a case in which the Supreme Court of the United States held that New Hampshire could not constitutionally require citizens to display the state motto upon their license plates when the state motto was offensive to their moral convictions.

Background 
Since 1969 New Hampshire had required that noncommercial vehicles bear license plates embossed with the state motto, "Live Free or Die". Another New Hampshire statute made it a misdemeanor "knowingly [to obscure] ... the figures or letters on any number plate". The term "letters" in this section had been interpreted by the State's highest court in State v. Hoskin to include the state motto.

Facts of the case 
George Maynard and his wife, followers of the Jehovah's Witnesses faith (albeit disfellowshipped), viewed the motto as repugnant to their moral, religious, and political beliefs, and for this reason, they covered up the motto on the license plates of their jointly owned family automobiles. On November 27, 1974, Maynard was issued a citation for violating the state statutes regarding obscuring of the state motto.

Prior history 
On December 6, 1974, Maynard appeared pro se in Lebanon District Court to answer the charge. After waiving his right to counsel, he entered a plea of not guilty and proceeded to explain his religious objections to the motto.  religious training and belief, I believe my 'government – Jehovah's Kingdom – offers everlasting life. It would be contrary to that belief to give up my life for the state, even if it meant living in bondage. ...  slogan is directly at odds with my deeply held religious convictions ... I also disagree with the motto on political grounds. I believe that life is more precious than freedom." The state trial judge expressed sympathy for Maynard's situation, but considered himself bound by the authority of State v. Hoskin, 112 N.H. 332 (1972), to hold Maynard guilty. The court imposed a $25 fine, but suspended it during "good behavior".

On December 28, 1974, Maynard was again charged with violating 262:27-c. He appeared in court on January 31, 1975, and again chose to represent himself; he was found guilty, fined $50, and sentenced to six months in the Grafton County House of Corrections. The court suspended this jail sentence but ordered Maynard to also pay the $25 fine for the first offense. Maynard informed the court that, as a matter of conscience, he refused to pay the two fines. The court thereupon sentenced him to jail for a period of 15 days. He served the full sentence.

Prior to trial on the second offense Maynard was charged with yet a third violation of 262:27-c on January 3, 1975. He appeared on this complaint on the same day as for the second offense, and was, again, found guilty. This conviction was "continued for sentence" so that Maynard received no punishment in addition to the 15 days.

On March 4, 1975, the Maynards sued in the United States District Court for the District of New Hampshire, seeking injunctive and declaratory relief against enforcement of N. H. Rev. Stat. Ann. 262:27-c, 263:1, insofar as these required displaying the state motto on their vehicle license plates, and made it a criminal offense to obscure the motto. On March 11, 1975, the District Court issued a temporary restraining order against further arrests and prosecutions of the Maynards. Because the appellees sought an injunction against a state statute on grounds of its unconstitutionality, a three-judge District Court was convened pursuant to 28 U.S.C. 2281. Following a hearing on the merits, the District Court entered an order enjoining the State "from arresting and prosecuting [the Maynards] at any time in the future for covering over that portion of their license plates that contains the motto 'Live Free or Die.

The Governor of New Hampshire chose to appeal to the United States Supreme Court, and it accepted the case.

Decision of the court
In a 6–3 decision, the Court held that New Hampshire could not constitutionally require citizens to display the state motto upon their vehicle license plates. Chief Justice Burger, writing for the Court, found that the statute in question effectively required individuals to "use their private property as a 'mobile billboard' for the State's ideological message". The Court held that the State's interests in requiring the motto did not outweigh free speech principles under the First Amendment, including "the right of individuals to hold a point of view different from the majority and to refuse to foster ... an idea they find morally objectionable". The state's interest in motor vehicle identification could be achieved by "less drastic means", and its interest in fostering state pride was not viewpoint-neutral.

Dissents
Justice Rehnquist wrote a dissenting opinion in which Justice Blackmun joined. Rehnquist wrote that

For First Amendment principles to be implicated, the State must place the citizen in the position of either apparently or actually "asserting as true" the message. This was the focus of Barnette [West Virginia State Board of Education v. Barnette, 319 U.S. 624 (1943)], and clearly distinguishes this case from that one.

In holding that the New Hampshire statute does not run afoul of our holding in Barnette, the New Hampshire Supreme Court ... aptly articulated why there is no required affirmation of belief in this case:

As found by the New Hampshire Supreme Court in Hoskin, there is nothing in state law which precludes appellees from displaying their disagreement with the state motto as long as the methods used do not obscure the license plates. Thus appellees could place on their bumper a conspicuous bumper sticker explaining in no uncertain terms that they do not profess the motto "Live Free or Die" and that they violently disagree with the connotations of that motto. Since any implication that they affirm the motto can be so easily displaced, I cannot agree that the state statutory system for motor vehicle identification and tourist promotion may be invalidated under the fiction that appellees are unconstitutionally forced to affirm, or profess belief in, the state motto.

See also
 Summers v. Adams: Circuit Court case involving South Carolina license plates
 Walker v. Texas Division, Sons of Confederate Veterans: Supreme Court case involving Texas license plates
 List of United States Supreme Court cases, volume 430
 Compelled speech

References

External links
 

1977 in religion
1977 in United States case law
April 1977 events in the United States
American Civil Liberties Union litigation
Christianity and law in the 20th century
Jehovah's Witnesses litigation in the United States
Legal history of New Hampshire
State mottos of the United States
United States Supreme Court cases
United States Supreme Court cases of the Burger Court
United States Free Speech Clause case law
Vehicle registration plates of the United States